Local elections were held in Las Piñas on May 13, 2010, within the Philippine general election. The voters elected for the elective local posts in the city: the mayor, vice mayor, one representative, and the councilors, six in each of the city's two legislative districts.

Background 
Incumbent Mayor Vergel "Nene" Aguilar was on first term, and sought for second term. His opponents were Felix Sinajon, Antonio "Doc" Abellar Jr., and Liberato "Levis" Gabano.

Incumbent Vice Mayor Henry Medina was on first term, and ran as councilor of city's First District. His party nominated former Vice Mayor Luis "Louie" Bustamante. Bustamante was challenged by Teodoro "Baldo" Baldomaro, former Councilor Benjamin Gonzales, and Estelita "Ester" Salentes.

Incumbent Representative Cynthia Villar was on her third and final term. Her party nominated her son, Mark Villar. Villar was challenged by Filipino "Filip" Alvarado, Francisco "Kiko" Antonio Jr., and Zusarah "Zarah" Veloria.

Results

For Representative, Lone District 
Mark Villar won with 144,977 votes while his closest rival, Francisco "Kiko" Antonio Jr. had 11,076 votes.

For Mayor 
Incumbent Mayor Vergel "Nene" Aguilar won with 174,422 votes while his closest rival Felix Sinajon had 8,354 votes.

For Vice Mayor 
Former Vice Mayor Luis "Louie" Bustamante won with 155,343 votes while his rival Benjamin Gonzales had 11,908 votes.

For Councilor

First District

Second District

References

External links
https://comelec.gov.ph/?r=Results/2010NLE/CityMun

2010 Philippine local elections
Elections in Las Piñas
2010 elections in Metro Manila